Pape Omar Faye (born 1 January 1987) is a Senegalese football striker who plays for Becamex Bình Dương.

Career
Faye started his career at Senegal. In 2005-06 he landed in Europe and played for Swiss side FC Thun. In Sept 2005, Faye made his debut in the UEFA Champions League in 87th minute as a substitute for Mauro Lustrinelli in the opening game of the group stage against Arsenal F.C. in Arsenal Stadium. He also played in the UEFA Europa League for FC Vaduz. Faye was a member of the 2009 match-fixing scandal and was suspended for one game. In the course of the determinations from the 2009 European football betting scandal was fired without notice on 25 January 2010.

In May 2010, he was given an open-ended suspension. Teammate Eldar Ikanović and former teammate David Blumer were also banned.

In January 2011, he signed a contract with Thanh Hóa F.C after a short time trial . He made Thanh Hóa F.C debut in 2011 Vietnamese Cup first round match against Hồ Chí Minh City F.C. and scored a goal in 57th minute . In the second round of 2011 Vietnamese Cup, he scored two goals and helped his team advance to quarterfinals with penalty won over Đà Nẵng F.C.

On 1 May 2011, he scored 3 goals in a match against XM The Vissai Ninh Bình in Thanh Hóa Stadium helped Lam Sơn Thanh Hóa F.C. win 3-1 and moved up to 4th position of 2011 V-League after 13 round. On 8 June, he scored the first away goal under the Lam Sơn Thanh Hóa F.C. jersey in the match his team was drawn with XM The Vissai Ninh Bình in the 18th round of 2011 V-League

On 10 July 2011, he scored 4 goals in the match against Becamex Bình Dương F.C. and help his team win this match with score 4-1.

In 2012, Thanh Hóa F.C. discovered his ban imposed by the FIFA, so they terminated the contract with him. According to Senegal's media, he was out of ban from football in December 2014 and played for ASC Diaraf in Senegal during this time.

Honours

Club
Hà Nội FC
V.League 1: 2019
Vietnamese Super Cup: 2018

References

1987 births
Living people
Senegalese footballers
FC Vaduz players
FC Thun players
Expatriate footballers in Switzerland
Coton Sport FC de Garoua players
Expatriate footballers in Liechtenstein
Swiss Super League players
Senegalese expatriate sportspeople in Switzerland
Expatriate footballers in Vietnam
Association football forwards
Thanh Hóa FC players
ASC Jaraaf players
Senegalese expatriate sportspeople in Vietnam
Hanoi FC players
V.League 1 players
Senegalese expatriate footballers
Pape Omar
Senegalese expatriate sportspeople in Liechtenstein